Eala is a genus of moths.

EALA may stand for:
 EA Los Angeles (formerly DreamWorks Interactive)
 East African Legislative Assembly